Gary F. Bengier (born February 25, 1955) is an American entrepreneur, business executive, technologist and writer. He is best known as the CFO of eBay, who led the company's initial and secondary public offerings. He also took senior executive positions at various Silicon Valley technology companies.

Bengier is the author of the philosophical speculative fiction novel Unfettered Journey.

Early life and career 

Bengier was raised in Richmond, Ohio. His father was a US veteran, who served as a U.S. Marine during the Korean War. 
 
From 1979 to 1981, Bengier attended Harvard Business School where he earned an MBA degree. In 2012, Bengier completed his MA degree in philosophy from San Francisco State University, where he studied philosophy of mind. Bengier also holds a BBA in Computer Science and Operations Research from Kent State University (summa cum laude).

Early in his career, Bengier served as corporate controller at Compass Design Automation in 1993–1996. Prior to eBay, he was a vice president and CFO of VXtreme, a streaming video company, later acquired by Microsoft Corporation.

eBay 
In 1997, Bengier joined eBay when the company was still in its early stages of development as  a startup. He remained with the company until 2001 as chief financial officer. Bengier was instrumental in building eBay's financial and administrative team in the early formative years. 
 
During his tenure, Bengier led the eBay's initial and secondary public offerings which raised $1.5 billion in equity capital. According to Adam Cohen's book, Bengier played a key role in taking eBay public in September 1998. As CFO Magazine notes: "the Harvard Business School-trained Bengier has helped transform the online auctioneer from a Silicon Valley startup into a Wall Street favorite".

Other ventures 
After 2001, Bengier served on Logitech's board of directors as chairman of the audit committee and lead independent director. He served on the board of Cobalt Networks, which was sold to Sun Microsystems. He also held senior financial positions in Bio-Rad Laboratories and Qume Corporation. Bengier spent several years as a management consultant for Touche Ross & Company.

Philanthropy and community involvement 

In 2004, Gary and his wife Cynthia established the Bengier Foundation, a charitable project supporting young students with educational grants. Bengier also serves on the board of trustees of the Exploratorium, a museum of science, technology, and arts in San Francisco, California, and on the board of the Santa Fe Institute.

Books 

In 2020, Bengier published his debut novel Unfettered Journey, which won several book awards.

References

Further reading 
Cohen, Adam. The Perfect Store: Inside eBay. Little, Brown and Company. ISBN 978-0-316-16493-1.

American chief financial officers
American financial businesspeople
Harvard Business School alumni
American fiction writers
EBay employees
EBay
San Francisco State University alumni
Kent State University alumni
1955 births
Living people